Hayde is a surname. Notable people with the surname include:

Anthony Hayde (1932–2014), New Zealand field hockey player
Desmond Hayde (1926–2013), Indian Army officer
Mick Hayde (born 1971), English footballer

See also
Hayden (surname)
Hyde (surname)